Thierry Ferland (born August 3, 1997) is a Canadian pair skater. With his skating partner, Lori-Ann Matte, he is the 2018 Canadian national junior champion and finished within the top ten at two World Junior Championships (2017, 2018).

Personal life 
Thierry Ferland was born August 3, 1997, in Quebec City, Canada. After attending Cégep de Sainte-Foy, he enrolled at Université Laval, where he is studying teaching through distance education.

Career

Early years 
Ferland began learning to skate in 2003. He teamed up with Lori-Ann Matte around 2010. The pair won the novice bronze medal at the 2015 Canadian Championships and the novice silver medal at the 2015 Canada Winter Games. The following season, they moved up to the junior level and placed 6th at the 2016 Canadian Championships.

2016–2017 season 
Matte/Ferland made their ISU Junior Grand Prix debut in September 2016. After winning the junior silver medal at the 2017 Canadian Championships, they were assigned to the 2017 World Junior Championships in Taipei. The pair ranked 7th in the short program, 12th in the free skate, and 9th overall at the competition in Taiwan. They were coached by Martine Simard in Lévis, Quebec until the end of the season. In May 2017, they relocated to Montréal.

2017–2018 season 
The pair lost several weeks of training after Matte broke her elbow in the autumn of 2017. In January, Matte/Ferland won the junior pairs' title at the 2018 Canadian Championships. They placed 10th in the short program, 7th in the free skate, and 9th overall at the 2018 World Junior Championships, which took place in March in Sofia, Bulgaria. Richard Gauthier and Bruno Marcotte coached the pair in Montréal.

2018–2019 season 
Making their senior international debut, Matte/Ferland placed fifth at the 2018 CS Autumn Classic International in September.  They were fourth at the 2020 Canadian Championships.

2019–2020 season 
Competing at two Challenger events to begin the season, Matte/Ferland were eight at the 2019 CS U.S. Classic and seventh at the 2019 CS Warsaw Cup.  They placed fifth at the 2020 Canadian Championships.

2020–2021 season 
Matte/Ferland were assigned to make their Grand Prix debut at the 2020 Skate Canada International, but the event was cancelled as a result of the coronavirus pandemic.  They made their competitive debut at the 2021 Skate Canada Challenge, the qualifying event for the national championships, winning the silver medal.

Matte/Ferland were named as alternates to the 2021 World Championships. With Canada's mandatory two-week quarantine for returning athletes; however, no member of the World team was assigned to the 2021 World Team Trophy, and they assigned as Canada's entry in the pairs segment. They finished sixth in both the short and free programs, while Team Canada finished in sixth place overall.

2021–2022 season 
Matte/Ferland made their competitive debut at the 2021 CS Autumn Classic International, where they placed seventh. Making their Grand Prix debut, they were seventh as well at the 2021 Skate Canada International. They placed fourth at the 2022 Canadian Championships. Assigned to compete at the 2022 Four Continents Championships, they finished sixth.

2022–2023 season 
The team began the season with a seventh-place finish at the 2022 CS U.S. Classic. Matte and Ferland were scheduled to compete on the Grand Prix at the 2022 MK John Wilson Trophy, but had to withdraw due to injury.

Programs 
(with Matte)

Competitive highlights 
GP: Grand Prix; CS: Challenger Series; JGP: Junior Grand Prix

 With Matte

 Men's Singles

References

External links 
 

1997 births
Canadian male pair skaters
French Quebecers
Living people
Sportspeople from Quebec City